Buddy (1982) is a novel written by Nigel Hinton.
The main characters are Buddy Clark, his mother Carol Clark, his father Terry Clark and Julian and Charmian Rybeero.
The story deals with issues such as racism, juvenile delinquency and child neglect.

The book was made into a television series starring Roger Daltrey as Buddy's father Terry in 1986.

It was the first installment in the Buddy trilogy and is followed by Buddy's Song (1987) which became a film (starring Chesney Hawkes and Roger Daltrey) in 1991 and Buddy's Blues (1995).

Buddy is still widely used in English classes at British and Irish secondary schools, sometimes with the TV series to compare the two media.

Concept
Nigel Hinton had great difficulty trying to start to write Buddy. The story had changed a lot by the time Nigel finished writing it. Buddy was originally nine years old, his name was Stuart, he liked tea, and he thought his cousin was a spy.

Plot

Buddy is a young boy who comes from a poor home. He is neglected by his parents and is often picked on at school for being poor. He lives at home with his parents. It all starts when Buddy wants some money to go on a school trip, but he knows that he is unlikely to go as he was unable to go on previous school trips because his parents do not have the money. When his mother tells him she does not have any money to give him, Buddy ends up stealing the money from her purse. His mother soon finds the money missing and asks Buddy where the money is. After admitting that he did take the money, his mum leaves the room, and being angry at Buddy, she replies, "Like father, like son," as his father was previously sent to prison for breaking and entering. Before leaving she adds "thief," and leaves Buddy upset crying. The next day Buddy finds out his mum has left, and subsequently left him alone. Four months later, with his mum still missing, Buddy is still being bullied at school, often being called dustman by the pupils and even his teacher, due to the state of his clothes. On top of this, Buddy is also bullied because he is friends with black twins Julius and Charmian who are also picked on in school.

Soon, Buddy's dad gets a job working a nightshift job, but because he refuses to tell Buddy what it is, this makes Buddy suspicious. That night he tells Buddy about the address 56 Croxley Street, telling him that the owner of the house killed his wife then hung himself, and that the house was said to be haunted. The following night Buddy tells his friends Julius and Charmian about the house and they decide to go. They find the house boarded up but to their surprise they find that someone is still living inside. They decide to come back in the next day and they speak to the woman who lives next door. She knew the owner of number 56 as "The Beast." They then decide to go to the house to investigate again, but the owner is out. The owner returns home whilst they are still there. They are terrified at first, but after speaking to the man, they soon find they have nothing to be scared of. In fact, 'The Beast' was just a man with learning difficulties named Ralph James Campbell.

Buddy soon has a parents' consultation evening at his school with Mr. Normington. His dad arrives in his 'teddy boy' outfit, and this makes Buddy feel embarrassed. Later that day, his dad leaves for work again leaving Buddy in the house alone. That night, Buddy looks out the window, and for a moment he thinks he sees the Beast standing outside of his house. He later hears the door bell ring and to his surprise, it is his mum, returned home.  She takes Buddy to a snack bar at the bus station and gives him the address to the flat she is currently sharing with a friend from her work and tells him that he can visit her anytime that he wants.

Buddy's dad soon gets his motorbike back, a Harley-Davidson which was confiscated before he got his job. In a good mood, he takes Buddy for a ride on the motorbike. They stop and take a break and he plays a few rounds against buddy on a pinball machine. Buddy's dad then goes to work. Later on that night, Buddy wakes to find his dad in the bathroom with his hands covered in blood. Buddy's dad claims he fell off his bike, however, Buddy does not believe him. Buddy finds a briefcase behind a door in his house containing jewellery and believes that his dad has stolen it. The next day, Buddy talks to his dad to come forward about the theft and stolen jewellery. His dad admits that he still continues with his robbery, and this makes Buddy very upset and he starts to cry. Buddy pleads with his dad that he stop stealing and his dad tells that him he will try. Buddy's dad asks him to call a man about the jewellery who was called Mr. King. Mr. King arrives at Buddy's house to discuss privately with his dad. Buddy overhears his dad telling Mr. King that he does not want anything to do with the thefts anymore, however, Mr. King ignores this and tells him that he will give him until Friday for his hands to get better before they meet next at 56 Croxley Street. Buddy decides that enough is enough and begins to form a plan to get Mr. King arrested. The plan involves keeping his dad away from 56 Croxley Street long enough for Mr. King to enter the house. Buddy ensures his dad is nowhere near the house at the time by convincing his mum to visit his dad. He knows this will keep his dad occupied for the time being. Buddy then has his friend Charmian telephone the police and tell them that someone is breaking into 56 Croxley street. They hope this will help to get Mr. King arrested.

However, upon arrival to 56 Croxley street, Buddy finds Mr. King leaving Croxley Street before the police have arrived. His plan has not worked. 
Buddy's dad soon arrives to Croxley Street with Buddy still there. Buddy tells his dad that he has called the police. Buddy's dad enters 56 to check on the owner of the House (Ralph), who Buddy had forgotten about. The police shortly arrive at the house and enter, only to emerge with Buddy's dad and Ralph under arrest with the stolen jewellery. They both enter the police car calmly although Ralph hides his head in his hands. Buddy was sure he saw his dad put his arm around Ralph. After spending two nights at Julius and Chairman's house, Buddy decides to escape to the country to avoid being put into care. He takes supplies from his house including a sleeping bag, and goes to the bus station and gets on a bus. Although Buddy originally plans to go to West Axle he gets off the bus earlier, just before it gets too dark. When he gets off the bus it is dark, and as he tries to head to a barn, he gets stopped by two big aggressive dogs blocking the way. In the end, he decides to take shelter in the wooden bus stop in his sleeping bag.

The next morning, which also happens to be Buddy's fourteenth birthday, Buddy decides to head to 56 Croxley Street as he knows he may be able to get shelter there. With the house empty, Buddy succeeds until Ralph returns home. Buddy's dad had told the police that Ralph had not been involved with the crimes. After talking with Ralph, he finds out that Ralph is his uncle on his mother's side of the family, and Ralph's father was the man who killed himself after murdering his wife. After spending the night at Ralph's house, Buddy decides to go to the place where his mum is staying, and along the way, he finds himself on the front page of newspapers saying that he is missing. Joyce (his mother's friend she is staying with) tells Buddy that his parents are looking for him and they were now at his house. Buddy goes there to find them (his dad being bailed out of prison by his mum). 
Six months later, Buddy's dad finds himself on trial, to which he pleads guilty and gets 18 months in prison. He also asks Buddy and his mum to play a Buddy Holly song every day to remind them of him. (The song they decide to play is Everyday.) The lyrics indicate to him that his dad would not be in prison very long and that he still loved them.

References

1982 British novels